Hungry ghost is a concept in Buddhism, and Chinese traditional religion, representing beings who are driven by intense emotional needs in an animalistic way.
The terms    literally "hungry ghost", are the Chinese translation of the term preta in Buddhism.
"Hungry ghosts" play a role in Chinese Buddhism and Taoism as well as in Chinese folk religion
The term is not to be confused with the generic term for "ghost" or damnation,   (i.e. the residual spirit of a deceased ancestor). The understanding is that all people become such a regular ghost when they die, and would then slowly weaken and eventually die a second time.

With the rise in popularity of Buddhism, the idea became popular that souls would live in space until reincarnation. In the Taoist tradition it is believed that hungry ghosts can arise from people whose deaths have been violent or unhappy. Both Buddhism and Taoism share the idea that hungry ghosts can emerge from neglect or desertion of ancestors. According to the Hua-yen Sutra evil deeds will cause a soul to be reborn in one of six different realms. The highest degree of evil deed will cause a soul to be reborn as a denizen of hell, a lower degree of evil will cause a soul to be reborn as an animal, and the lowest degree will cause a soul to be reborn as a hungry ghost. According to the tradition, evil deeds that lead to becoming a hungry ghost are killing, stealing and sexual misconduct. Desire, greed, anger and ignorance are all factors in causing a soul to be reborn as a hungry ghost because they are motives for people to perform evil deeds.

Myths of origin 
It is likely that the idea of hungry ghosts originated from ancient Indian culture, where they were referred to as Preta. However, there are many legends regarding the origin of hungry ghosts. 

In the Buddhist tradition there are stories from Chuan-chi po-yuan ching ("Sutra of One Hundred Selected Legends") that is from the early third century. Some examples of these stories are as follows:

One story is of a rich man who traveled selling sugar-cane juice. One day a monk came to his house looking for some juice to cure an illness. The man had to leave, so he instructed his wife to give the monk the drink in his absence. Instead of doing this, she secretly urinated in the monk's bowl, added sugar cane juice to it and gave it to the monk. The monk was not deceived; he poured out the bowl and left. When the wife died she was reborn as a hungry ghost.

Another such tale is of a man who was giving and kind. One day he was about to leave his house when a monk came by begging. The man instructed his wife to give the monk some food. After the man left his house his wife was overcome with greed. She took it upon herself to teach the monk a lesson, so she locked the monk in an empty room all day with no food. She was reborn as a hungry ghost for innumerable lifetimes.

Most times the legends speak of hungry ghosts who in a previous lifetime were greedy women who refused to give away food. Other stories in the Buddhist tradition come from Kuei wen mu-lien ching ("The Sutra on the Ghosts Questioning Mu-lien"). One of the stories tells of a man who was a diviner who constantly misled people due to his own avarice and is now a hungry ghost. There is another story in "The Legend of Mu-lien Entering the City and Seeing Five Hundred Hungry Ghosts". The story is about five hundred men that were sons of elders of the city they lived in. When monks came begging to the city for food, the sons denied them because they thought the monks would keep coming back and eventually take all their food. After the sons died they were reborn as hungry ghosts.

In China 

In Chinese Buddhism, The World of the Hungry Ghosts (鬼法界, 鬼界) is one of the six domains of the desire realm of Buddhism. There is a belief in the oral tradition of Chinese ancestral worship that the ghosts of the ancestors may be granted permission to return to the world of the living at a certain time of the year, hungry and ready to take what they can from there, if these spirits had not been given sufficient offerings by their living relatives.

A festival called the Hungry Ghost Festival ( is held to honor the hungry ancestor ghosts and food and drink is put out to satisfy their needs. The Hungry Ghost Festival is celebrated during the seventh month of the Chinese calendar. It also falls at the same time as a full moon, the new season, the fall harvest, the peak of monastic asceticism, the rebirth of ancestors, and the assembly of the local community. According to tradition, during this month, the gates of hell are opened up and the hungry ghosts are free to roam the earth where they seek food and entertainment.  These ghosts are believed to be ancestors of those who have forgotten to pay tribute to them after they died. They have long thin necks because they have not been fed by their families. Tradition states that families should offer prayers to their deceased relatives and burn "hell money". It is believed that "hell money" is a valid currency in the underworld and helps ghosts to live comfortably in the afterlife. People also burn other forms of joss paper such as paper houses, cars and televisions to please the ghosts. This festival is one of numerous tantric practices from Chinese Esoteric Buddhism preserved in modern Chinese Buddhism after the various Buddhist traditions started to merge in the early modern period.

Families also pay tribute to other unknown wandering ghosts so that these homeless souls do not intrude on their lives and bring misfortune.  A big feast is held for the ghosts on the 15th day of the seventh month, where people bring samples of food and place them on the offering table to please the ghosts and ward off bad luck. Live shows are also put on and everyone is invited to attend. The first row of seats is always empty as this is where the ghosts are supposed to sit to better enjoy the live entertainment. The shows are always put on at night and at high volumes, so that the sound attracts and pleases the ghosts.  These acts were better known as "Merry-making".

The chief Taoist priest of the town wears an ornate crown of five gold and red panels, a practice borrowed from Buddhism. This represented the five most powerful deities (The Jade Emperor, Guan Yu, Tu Di Gong, Mazu and Xi Wangmu). He is believed to become their voice on earth.

A sacrificial altar and a chair are built for a priest either at a street entrance or in front of the village. The Bodhisattva Ksitigarbha sits in front of the chair. Under the chair are plates of rice flour and peaches. Sitting on the altar are three spirit tablets and three funeral banners. After noon, sheep, pigs, chicken, fruits, and cakes are donated by families that are displayed on the altar. A priest will put a triangular paper banner of three colors with special characters on every sacrifice. After the music begins to play, the priest hits the bell to call the hungry ghosts back to the table. He then throws the rice and peaches into the air in all directions to distribute them to the ghosts.

During the evening, incense is burnt in front of the doors of households. Incense stands for prosperity, the more incense burnt, the greater one's prosperity.  During the festival, shops are closed to leave the streets open for the ghosts. In the middle of each street stands an altar of incense with fresh fruit and sacrifices displayed on it. Behind the altar,  monks will sing songs that it is believed only the ghosts can understand. This rite is called shi ge'r, meaning "singing ghost songs".

Fifteen days after the feast, to make sure all the hungry ghosts find their way back to hell, people float lanterns on water and set them outside their houses. These lanterns are made by setting a lotus flower-shaped lantern on a piece of board. Hungry ghosts are believed to have found their way back when the lanterns go out.

There are many folk beliefs and taboos surrounding the Hungry Ghost Festival. Spirits are thought to be dangerous, and can take many forms, including snakes, moths, birds, foxes, wolves, and tigers. Some can even use the guise of a beautiful man or woman to seduce and possess. One story refers to a ghost which takes the form of a pretty girl and seduces a young man until a priest intervenes and sends the spirit back to hell. It is believed that possession can cause illness and/or mental disorders.

During the seventh month of the Chinese calendar, children are advised (usually by an elder in the family) to be home before dark, and not to wander the streets at night for fear a ghost might possess them. Swimming is thought to be dangerous as well, as spirits are believed to have drowned people. People will generally avoid driving at night, for fear of a "collision", or spiritual offence, which is any event leading to illness or misfortune.  While "ghost" is a commonly used term throughout the year, many people use the phrase "backdoor god" or "good brother" instead during the 7th month, so as not to anger the ghosts.  Another thing to avoid is sampling any of the food placed on the offering table, as doing this can result in "mysterious illness".  Any person attending a show at indoor entertainment venues (getais) will notice the first row of chairs is left empty. These seats are reserved for the spirits, and it is considered bad form to sit in them. After an offering has been burnt for the spirits, stepping on or near the burnt area should be avoided, as it is considered an "opening" to the spirit world and touching it may cause the person to be possessed.

The English term has often been used metaphorically to describe the insatiable craving of an addict.

In Tibet
In Tibetan Buddhism, Hungry Ghosts (Tib. ཡི་དྭགས་, Wyl. yi dwags, Sanskrit: preta) have their own realm depicted on the Bhavacakra and are represented as teardrop or paisley-shaped with bloated stomachs and necks too thin to pass food so that attempting to eat is also incredibly painful. Some are described as having "mouths the size of a needle's eye and a stomach the size of a mountain". This is a metaphor for people futilely attempting to fulfill their illusory physical desires.

According to the History of Buddhism, as elements of Chinese Buddhism entered a dialogue with Indian Buddhism in the Tibetan Plateau, this synthesis is evident in the compassion rendered in the form of blessed remains of food, etc., offered to the pretas in rites such as Ganachakra.

In Japan 

In Japanese Buddhism, the Hungry Ghosts are considered to have two variants: the gaki and the jikininki.  Gaki (餓鬼) are the spirits of jealous or greedy people who, as punishment for their mortal vices, have been cursed with an insatiable hunger for a particular substance or object. Traditionally, this is something repugnant or humiliating, such as human corpses or feces, though in more recent legends, it may be virtually anything, no matter how bizarre. Jikininki (食人鬼 "people-eating ghosts") are the spirits of greedy, selfish or impious individuals who are cursed after death to seek out and eat human corpses. They do this at night, scavenging for newly dead bodies and food offerings left for the dead. They sometimes also loot the corpses they eat for valuables. Nevertheless, jikininki lament their condition and hate their repugnant cravings for dead human flesh. 

The Hungry Ghosts Scroll kept at the Kyoto National Museum depicts the world of the hungry ghosts and the suffering of these creatures, and contains tales of salvation of the ghosts. The whole scroll has been designated as National Treasure of Japan and it was possibly part of a set of scrolls depicting the six realms which was kept at Sanjūsangen-dō.

Types of spirits 

It is believed that the soul contains elements of both yin and yang. The yin is the kui, or demon part, and the yang is the shen, or spirit part. When death occurs, the kui should return to earth, and the shen to the grave or family shrine. If a ghost is neglected, it will become a kui. The shen, or ancestral spirit, watches over its descendants, and can bring good fortune if properly worshipped.

Hungry ghosts are different from the ghosts of Chinese which all people are believed to become after death. 

According to the Nyāyānusāriṇī, there are three main groups of hungry ghosts, each of which are divided into three sub-groups:
ghosts of no wealth (無財鬼)
 torch or flaming mouths (炬口鬼): These ghosts regurgitate fierce flames with mouths of inextinguishable embers. Their bodies are like that of a palmyra tree. This is the karmic result of stinginess.
 needle mouths (針口鬼): These ghosts have bellies as vast as mountain valleys. Their mouth are like the hole of a needle. Even if they find food or drink, they cannot consume it. Thus they suffer from hunger and thirst.
 putrid mouths (臭口鬼): These ghosts give off a great decomposing odor from their mouths. They may be found at privies overflowing with filth and fecal matter. They constantly emit a nauseating, evil fumes. Although they find food, they cannot eat it. This fills them with anger and they run about shrieking.
ghosts of little wealth (少財鬼)
 needle hair (針毛鬼): These ghosts have bodies made of hair, firm like spears. They are unapproachable. Their insides burn, as a deer shot with a poison arrow. They run about suffering from ulcers. Only small quantities of impure food can allay their hunger. 

 putrid hair (臭毛鬼): These ghosts also have bodies made of hair that smells incredibly foul. Their flesh and bones emit noxious fumes and their bowels are full of grime. They are agitated from poison in their throats and their skin splits when their hair is pulled out. Only small quantities of impure food can allay their hunger.
 swollen (癭鬼): Large protuberances grow in their throats. They suffer from aches and fever. They smell of pus that gushes forth from their bodies. They fight with each other over food. They consume small bits of pus and blood and can be somewhat satiated. 
ghosts of much wealth (多財鬼)
ghosts of sacrifices (希祠鬼): These ghosts live off sacrifices offered by humans. One is reborn here by ethically gathering wealth, but with a stingy heart does not practice generosity. If one is reborn here, their descendants can make offerings to satiate their hunger. 
ghosts of losses (希棄鬼): These ghosts are always covetous, searching out filth like vomit and feces to eat. In life, they sought out and found enjoyment in both clean and unclean things, and were thus reborn here.
ghosts of great power (大勢鬼): includes certain yakshas, rakshasas, kumbhandas and the like who are the powerful rulers of the spirits. They reside in forests, stupas, mountain valleys, and empty palaces. Those with no authoritative power live on all four continents except for Uttarakuru. Those with authoritative power may also be found in the heavens and on two of the five-hundred islands that lie to the west of Jambudvipa. One island holds their castle while the other holds the castle of those ghosts with no authority.

Sixteen hungry ghosts are said to live in hell or in a region of hell. Unlike other hell dwellers, they can leave hell and wander. They look through garbage and human waste on the outskirts of human cities. They are said to be invisible during the daylight hours but visible at night. Some hungry ghosts can only eat corpses, or their food is burnt up in their mouths, sometimes they have a big belly and a neck as thin as a needle (this image is the basic one for hungry ghosts in Asian Buddhism).

According to the Saddharmasmṛtyupasthāna Sūtra, there are thirty-six different types of hungry ghost.

See also
 Buddhist cosmology
 Ghosts in Chinese culture
 Ghosts in Vietnamese culture
 Ghosts in Thai culture
 Obon
 Segaki
 Soul dualism
 Vengeful ghost

References

Asian folklore
Ghosts
Yaoguai
Metaphors
Undead
Buddhist legendary creatures
Buddhism in China
Concepts in Chinese folk religion
Religion in China
Chinese legendary creatures
Buddhism in Asia
Japanese mythology
Buddhism and death